"Prayer for Ukraine" is a patriotic Ukrainian hymn published in 1885, which became a spiritual anthem of Ukraine. The text was written by Oleksandr Konysky, and the music was composed by Mykola Lysenko, first with a children's choir in mind. The song became the regular closing hymn in services of the Ukrainian Greek Catholic Church, the Orthodox Church of Ukraine and other churches. It gained national significance when it was performed by mass choirs during the Ukrainian War of Independence in 1917–1920. The hymn was intended to be an official spiritual anthem of Ukraine. It has closed sessions of oblast councils, and has been performed at major national functions.

"Prayer for Ukraine" was performed in Kyiv in 2001 during a parade celebrating the 10th anniversary of Ukraine's independence. It has been part of church services internationally, in response to the 2022 Russian invasion of Ukraine. On 26 February 2022, the Ukrainian Chorus Dumka of New York performed the hymn in the cold open of Saturday Night Live.

History 
Oleksandr Konysky wrote a patriotic poem from February to 28 March 1885 in Kyiv, at a time when the Imperial Russian government suppressed the use of the Ukrainian language. The melody and a choral setting were written by Mykola Lysenko, a composer who inspired a Ukrainian national school of composition.

It was printed in Lviv in the summer of 1885, intended for a children's choir. The first title read: Молитва. Гімнѣ, на жѣночи голоси. Слова О. Я. Кониського, музика Миколы Лисенка, — Львовѣ., 1885, Лит[ографія] П. Прищляка, 4 с. (Prayer. Hymn, for women's voices. Text written by O. Ya. Konysky, Music Mykola Lysenko, Lviv., 1885, Lithography P. Pryshliak, 4 p.). It came as a score, with separate parts for soprano and alto. The setting proved to be too difficult for usual children's choirs.

On August 2, Prayer was first performed in Ternopil at a literary and musical evening on the occasion of a travel of Lviv students in Podillya.

It acquired symbolic significance during the Ukrainian War of Independence in 1917–1920, then performed by thousands of choirs, conducted by Kyrylo Stetsenko, on Bohdan Khmelnytsky Square in Kyiv. It was sung at a national-patriotic rally on 20 December 1917, and on the occasion of the Unification Act of the UPR and WUPR on 22 January 1919.

On 14 July 1998, with an initiative of the Cabinet of Ministers of Ukraine, the hymn was part of the law project registered under #1229 "About the text of the State Anthem of Ukraine and the Spiritual Anthem of Ukraine". The author of the project was Anatoliy Holubchenko, a native of Mariupol and then First Vice Prime Minister of Ukraine (1997–99).

Lyrics

Usage

Churches 
"Prayer for Ukraine" closes each liturgy in the Ukrainian Greek Catholic Church, as well as the Orthodox Church of Ukraine and other churches.

National spiritual anthem 
The anthem is sung at the end of some meetings of oblasts, raions, and city councils. Other occasions include the Day of Unity of Ukraine, Holodomor Memorial Day, and the anniversary of the deportation of the Crimean Tatars. In his memoir, Taras Hunczak recalled that the song opened a 1991 concert at the Taras Shevchenko National Opera and Ballet Theatre, organised by the Verkhovna Rada (the parliament of Ukraine) and celebrating the 125th anniversary of Mykhailo Hrushevsky's birth. It was performed on Khreshchatyk, the main street of Kyiv, in 2001 during the celebrations of the 10th anniversary of Ukraine's independence; The Ukrainian Weekly described it as "perhaps one of the most inspiring moments of the parade". In 2007, the Veryovka Ukrainian Folk Choir sang it at the opening of the sixth convocation of the Verkhovna Rada.

Recordings 

"Prayer for Ukraine" has been recorded several times. Oreya, a choir focused on Ukrainian music, chose the hymn as the first song of their 2000 album, its name as the title. It was also the opening of their 20th anniversary album in 2009. In 2002, Ukrainian Bandurist Chorus recorded "Prayer for Ukraine" in the album Golden echoes of Kyiv.

2022 
"Prayer for Ukraine" has been performed internationally in church services related to the 2022 Russian invasion of Ukraine, already in anticipation of the conflict. On 24 February 2022, the day that the invasion officially began, the Los Angeles Chamber Orchestra spontaneously included "Prayer for Ukraine", arranged by its music librarian Serge Liberovsky, in a series concert in Santa Monica, between Mozart's Divertimento for String Trio and Dvořák's Serenade for Winds. It was introduced by an address about its significance. On 26 February, the Ukrainian Chorus Dumka of New York, a group founded in 1949 "to preserve and cultivate the rich musical heritage of Ukraine", performed the hymn in the cold open of Saturday Night Live, standing behind a table of candles that were arranged to spell "Kyiv".

References

External links

 

Compositions by Mykola Lysenko
Ukrainian patriotic songs
1885 songs
19th-century hymns